The South American U-17 Championship is a football competition held every two years for South American under-17 teams. The tournament was born in 1985 out of a need for a classification tournament for the newly created FIFA U-16 World Cup (now the FIFA U-17 World Cup). For the first three editions (1985, 1986, and 1988), the competition was limited to under-16 teams. Afterwards, the age limit was raised one year. The tournament is held every two years. Since the first edition, Brazil has been the dominant force of the tournament, winning a record twelve times.

Results

Notes

Performances by country

* = As hosts

Participating nations
Legend
1st – Champions
2nd – Runners-up
3rd – Third place
4th – Fourth place
5th-6th – Fifth to Sixth place
7th-9th – Seventh to Ninth place
GS – Group stage
 ×  – Did not enter
     – Hosts

Overall statistics

Men's U-17 World Cup Qualifiers
Legend
1st – Champions
2nd – Runners-up
3rd – Third place
4th – Fourth place
QF – Quarterfinals
R2 – Round 2
R1 – Round 1
     – Hosts
q – Qualified for upcoming tournament

See also
FIFA U-17 World Cup
South American Under-15 Football Championship
South American Youth Football Championship

References

External links
 

CONMEBOL competitions
Under-17 association football
 
South American youth sports competitions